Richard Waverley Head Ballantyne, CBE, COP (10 October 1896 – 1 August 1965) was a British police officer and was the Inspector General of Police of the Gold Coast Police Service from 21 May 1944 to 18 August 1948.

References

1896 births
1965 deaths
Ghanaian police officers
Ghanaian Inspector Generals of Police
Commanders of the Order of the British Empire
British colonial police officers
British people in the British Gold Coast